Jean-Charles Cistacq (born 22 July 1974 in Auch), is a French rugby union player. He has played for Section Paloise.

Career
Jean-Charles Cistacq began playing Rugby Union with SU Agen. He moved to Section Paloise in 2000. With his new club he lost the final of European Challenge Cup against Sale Sharks in 2005. He earned his only cap playing for the French national team on 28 May 2000 against Romania.

External links 
 Jean-Charles Cistacq international statistics

French rugby union players
France international rugby union players
Living people
1974 births
Rugby union centres